The 1982 Toray Sillook Open was a women's singles tennis tournament played on indoor carpet courts at Yoyogi National Gymnasium in Tokyo in Japan. The event was part of the Category 5 of the 1982 Toyota Series. It was the tenth edition of the tournament and was held from 13 September through 19 September 1982. Third-seeded Bettina Bunge won the title and earned $40,000 first-prize money.

Finals

Singles
 Bettina Bunge defeated  Barbara Potter 7–6(7–4), 6–2
It was Bunge's 3rd singles title of the year and of her career.

Prize money

Notes

References

TV Tokyo Open
Pan Pacific Open
1982 in Japanese tennis
TV Tokyo Open
TV Tokyo Open
TV Tokyo Open